The still-room maid is a female servant who works in the still room, the functional room in a great house in which drinks and jams are made.  The still-room maid is a junior servant, and as a member of the between staff, reports to both the housekeeper and the cook.

Once common in houses with large staffs, the still-room maid is rare in the 21st century.

 Still
Obsolete occupations